Thomas George Sharpe III (April 6, 1917December 18, 2000) was a Michigan politician.

Early life
Thomas George Sharpe III was born on April 6, 1917, in Fowlerville, Michigan to parents Thomas George Sharpe Jr. and Laura Sharpe.

Education
Sharpe attended the Detroit Business Institute.

Career
Sharpe served as a delegate to the Michigan state constitutional convention from the Shiawassee district from 1961 to 1962. On November 6, 1962, Sharpe was elected to the Michigan House of Representatives where he represented the Shiawassee County district from January 1, 1963, to January 1, 1965. On November 4, 1964, Sharpe was elected to the Michigan House of Representatives where he represented the 51st district from January 1, 1965, to January 1, 1979.

Personal life
On November 7, 1936, Sharpe married Esther Diane Cornell. Together, they had four children. Sharpe was a member of the Nazarene Church.

Death
Sharpe died on December 18, 2000. His last residence was in Howell, Michigan. He was interred at Riddle Cemetery in Howell.

References

1917 births
2000 deaths
Burials in Michigan
Detroit Business Institute alumni
American members of the Church of the Nazarene
People from Fowlerville, Michigan
People from Howell, Michigan
Republican Party members of the Michigan House of Representatives
20th-century American politicians
20th-century Methodists